"The Frim-Fram Sauce" is a jazz song written by Redd Evans and Joe Ricardel. In 2002, journalist William Safire said frim-fram sauce was a variant of flim-flam or deceit and "ussin-fay" was pig Latin for "fussing", meaning "playing about fretfully". Safire quoted singer Diana Krall on the meaning of "shafafa": "'It's all about sex,' she replied innocently."
	
The song was made famous by The King Cole Trio whose recording on October 11, 1945 (Capitol 224) reached the Billboard charts with a peak position of No. 19. "The Frim-Fram Sauce" was recorded by Ella Fitzgerald with Louis Armstrong in 1946 and many other artists have also made recordings  including Diana Krall who recorded the song for her albums Stepping Out (1993) and All for You: A Dedication to the Nat King Cole Trio (1996).

References

1945 songs
Jazz songs
Novelty songs
Nat King Cole songs
Songs with lyrics by Redd Evans